Ochrolechia minuta is a species of crustose lichen in the family Ochrolechiaceae. It was first formally described in 1938 by Swedish lichenologist Gunnar Degelius as Perforaria minuta. The type specimen was collected from the Kodiak Island Borough in Alaska. Toby Spribille transferred it to the genus Ochrolechia in 2020, suggesting that the absence of cephalodia, and the presence of alectoronic acid, indicate that it is "related to the alectoronic acid-containing species of poriform Ochrolechia".

References

Pertusariales
Lichen species
Lichens described in 1938
Lichens of Subarctic America
Fungi without expected TNC conservation status